Ether was an experimental music project by John Watts, released under the name Fischer-Z. After releasing two successful solo albums and one album of remixes, since the last Fischer-Z album, Stream, John Watts had started to take an interest in creating big beat music. After creating a whole big beat style album in 1999 entitled Bigbeatpoetry, Watts carried on in a similar style for Ether. He recorded a number of songs, featuring only his guitar and voice, and then put them over cut-up beats as a rhythm track. Watts had also added a filmic touch to the project, he travelled throughout Europe and post-9/11 New York City to find musicians at random and record them using his laptop, in their homes and on the street. Sarah Vermeersch filmed & edited the process into a road movie. Ether was further released as a John Watts solo album (see: Ether Music & Film), including the road movie DVD and a CD of tracks from the Ether album that appeared in the movie.

Track listing
"Ether"
"Jukebox"
"Supernatural"
"Famous"
"Glorious"
"Beep"
"Eclipse"
"Amnesty"
"Promenaders"
"Fury"
"Home"
"Plummeting"
"Anything"
"Over"
"Valley"
"Only"

Personnel (as credited on CD)
John Watts - vocals, guitars, keyboards, plus
Tristan Banks - drums, programming, percussion & laid-back enthusiasm, Queen's Park
Pete Sinden - bass & stability, Flat 5. Brighton
Graham Bonnett - "Mr. Soundgood", Brighton & Saffron Walden
Felix Gauder - "Jukebox" production, Daylight Studios, Stuttgart.
Jens Krause - "Eclipse" production, wise words & warmth, Hanover.
Christof Stein-Schneider - rock 'n' roll guitar, Hanover.
Danny Dziuk - Hammond from the tower, Berlin.
Hans Rohe - slide guitar, atmospherics, Berlin.
Moe Jaksch - stand-up bass, Berlin.
Rausch - sex & drugs & rock climbing, Koln.
Phil Evans - devil's advocate production, clapping, keyboards, vocals on Greenpeace Roof, Antwerp & Brussels
Raoul Del Campo - accordion & cajon, Korte Achterom, Antwerp
Nikko Weidemann - organ, guitar & bonhomie, NYC
The 3 Rappers - rhymes in Times Square, Manhattan
Scott Allen - the funk cello, Blue Beach, Nice
Lucie, Emillie & Leila Watts - vocals, Flat 5, Brighton.
Ben Stobart - ragga, alto saxophone, Barcelona.
Rupert Cobb - muted trumpet, Flat 5, Brighton & trumpet at Rupe's Place
Dan Rehahn - fruity trombone
Kerry Wilson - tenor saxophone
Rob Reed - purple alto saxophone at Rupe's Place
Steve Cropper - electric guitar, The Grand Hotel, Amsterdam

References 

2002 albums
Fischer-Z albums